Seymour Stanley Cohen (April 30, 1917-December 30, 2018) was an American biochemist. Cohen was born in Brooklyn, New York in April 1917. He attended City College of New York and his PhD came from Columbia University under the supervision of Erwin Chargaff. In the 1940s he worked on plant viruses and for the Rockefeller Institute. He was awarded a Guggenheim Fellowship in 1945. He is known by his studies with marked of radioactive isotopes, whose results suggested an essential role of DNA in hereditary genetic material. This result would be checked in 1952 by Hershey and Chase.

References

Bibliography 
 
 
 
 
 
 
 Tertiary sources
 
 

1917 births
2018 deaths
American biochemists
American centenarians
Columbia University alumni
Members of the United States National Academy of Sciences
Men centenarians
People from Brooklyn
Scientists from New York City
Stony Brook University faculty
University of Colorado Boulder faculty
University of Pennsylvania faculty
Members of the National Academy of Medicine